The 1987–88 Washington State Cougars men's basketball team represented Washington State University for the 1987–88 NCAA Division I men's basketball season. Led by first-year head coach Kelvin Sampson, the Cougars were members of the Pacific-10 Conference and played their home games on campus at Beasley Coliseum in Pullman, Washington.

At the conference tournament's last quarterfinal, WSU upset third seed UCLA by two points. In the semifinal, the Cougars took second-seeded Oregon State to double overtime, but lost by six points.

Sampson was promoted to head coach in April 1987, and led the program for seven seasons.

Roster

Postseason results

|- 
!colspan=9 style=| Regular season

|-
!colspan=9 style=| Pacific-10 Tournament

References

External links
Sports Reference – Washington State Cougars: 1987–88 basketball season

Washington State Cougars men's basketball seasons
Washington State Cougars
Washington State
Washington State